Dan Ferro was an American actor, best known for his role as Tommy Ortega in the 1980s television series Falcon Crest and for his role as drug lord Tony Romero in Death Wish 4: The Crackdown. Among his other works, he played an inept narcissistic soldier in 1996's Sgt. Bilko, and later appeared in the 2001 film Blow.

Filmography

Film

Television

References

External links

American male film actors
American male television actors
Place of birth missing (living people)
Living people
1960 births